George Mark Bergman, born on 22 July 1943 in Brooklyn, New York, is an American mathematician. He attended Stuyvesant High School in New York City and received his Ph.D. from Harvard University in 1968, under the direction of John Tate. The year before he had been appointed Assistant Professor of mathematics at the University of California, Berkeley, where he has taught ever since, being promoted to Associate Professor in 1974 and to Professor in 1978.

His primary research area is algebra, in particular associative rings, universal algebra, category theory and the construction of counterexamples. Mathematical logic is an additional research area. Bergman officially retired in 2009, but is still teaching. His interests beyond mathematics include subjects as diverse as third-party politics and the works of James Joyce.

He was designated a member of the Inaugural Class of Fellows of the American Mathematical Society in 2013.

Selected bibliography
  (updated 2016)
 
 
 (with Adam O. Hausknecht)

References

External links
 
 Wall Street Journal article, Oct 27, 2009
 UC Berkeley website

University of California, Berkeley College of Letters and Science faculty
20th-century American mathematicians
21st-century American mathematicians
Stuyvesant High School alumni
Living people
1943 births
Harvard University alumni
People from Brooklyn
Mathematicians from New York (state)
Algebraists
Fellows of the American Mathematical Society